De Novo Dahl is an Indie rock group from Murfreesboro, Tennessee. Formed in 2001, they were signed to Roadrunner Records and released from their contract in 2009. They are currently signed to Theory 8 Records.

History
The band was formed in 2001 by Joel Dahl, Serai Zaffiro, Derek Sandidge, Joey Andrews, Jon Schneck (later replaced by David Carney), and Mark Bond. The band took their name from the Latin words for "The New" and the last name of author Roald Dahl. Keyboardist Mark Bond left the group amicably in 2006 and now plays keyboard for The Features. He was replaced by Matthew Hungate. The group signed to Roadrunner Records in 2007. In 2008, the band was asked by Warner Bros. to record a theme song for the film Speed Racer, but the song was rejected by the Wachowskis.

Members of De Novo Dahl appeared as a music group called Fall Formal in the 2008-released film Make-out with Violence. David Carney and Matthew Hungate also contributed to the music in the film.

Lineup
Joel McAnulty (aka Joel Dahl) - Vocals, Guitar
Serai Zaffiro - Omnichord, Vocals
Keith Lowen - Bass
Matthew Hungate - Keyboard
Joey Andrews (aka Mixta Huxtable) - Drums

Former members
Mark Bond - Keyboard, Vocals (left 2006)
Derek "Sandy" Sandidge - Guitar, Vocals (left 2006)
Dave Carney - Bass, Vocals (left 2006)
Arlo Hall - Keyboards (left 2007)

Discography

Albums
De Novo Dahl EP (2003, self release)
Cats & Kittens (2005, Emergent Records)
Move Every Muscle, Make Every Sound (2008, Roadrunner Records)
City Driver (2009, Theory 8 Records)
Bobby Thompson Reels, Vol. 1 (2010, Theory 8 Records)
Tigerlion (2010, Theory 8 Records)

Singles
 "Sexy Come Lately" (2007)
 "Shout" (2008)

References

External links

De Novo Dahl interview on Palestra.net

Indie rock musical groups from Tennessee
Musical groups established in 2001
2001 establishments in Tennessee